Modesto Alex "Mitch" Maidique (pronounced /maɪdiːkɛ/; born March 20, 1940) was the fourth president of Florida International University (FIU), a public university in the United States, whose main campus is named after him. Appointed in 1986, Maidique was the longest-serving university president in Florida and the second longest-serving research university president in the United States . On November 14, 2008, Maidique presented his resignation to the FIU Board of trustees. On April 25, 2009, Mark B. Rosenberg was chosen to succeed Maidique and assumed office on August 3, 2009.

Past president of FIU

Modesto Maidique was president of FIU for 23 years. During his tenure, the Colleges of Law and Engineering and a School of Architecture were established. The FIU College of Medicine was also founded in 2006. The first class of medical students began their studies in August 2009.

On November 14, 2008, Maidique announced his resignation from his post as President of FIU. On June 12, 2009, FIU's Board of Trustees voted to rename the University Park campus to the Modesto A. Maidique Campus.

Professional background

Maidique was born in Havana, Cuba on March 20, 1940. Both of his parents were educators and his father served as a Congressman and Senator in Cuba. As a supporter of Fulgencio Batista, Maidique chose to leave Cuba after Fidel Castro overthrew the regime. From 1976 to 1986, he held academic appointments at the Massachusetts Institute of Technology, Harvard University, and Stanford University.

Maidique co-founded the Analog Devices, Inc., Semiconductor Division, in 1969. He served as CEO of Collaborative Research, a genetic engineering company that is now Genome Therapeutics, from 1981 to 1983, and as senior partner in Harbrecht & Quist Venture Partners from 1984 to 1986. He holds three US patents for semiconductor devices.

From 1984 to 1986, Maidique was a professor of business management at the University of Miami.

In 1989, US President George H. W. Bush appointed him to the President’s Educational Policy Advisory Committee, and served in a similar capacity for President George W. Bush. Maidique later served on the United States Secretary of Energy Advisory Board and is a member of the Presidential Scholars Commission.

Maidique serves on the boards of National Semiconductor and the Carnival Corporation. He is past chairman of the Beacon Council, Miami’s economic development authority.

Maidique has published in academic journals. He is a contributing author to ten books, and a co-author of Strategic Management of Technology and Innovation. An article he co-authored, "The Art of High Technology Management" published in the Sloan Management Review. He is also a co-author of Energy Future, a New York Times Best Seller on energy policy.

Personal

Maidique earned a Bachelor of Science (1962), Master of Science (1964), and Doctor of Philosophy (1970) in electrical engineering from the Massachusetts Institute of Technology.  He also completed the Program for Management Development at the Harvard Business School in 1975.  Maidique is a Phi Beta Kappa FIU alumni, and has two children, Ana Teresa and Mark Alex.

References

1940 births
Living people
Cuban emigrants to the United States
Harvard University alumni
Harvard University faculty
American chief executives
Massachusetts Institute of Technology faculty
People from Miami
Presidents of Florida International University
Stanford University School of Engineering faculty
University of Miami faculty